Munisamy Thambidurai (born 15 March 1947) is an Indian politician who served as the  Deputy Speaker of the Lok Sabha and leader of All India Anna Dravida Munnetra Kazhagam (AIADMK) in the Lok Sabha, the lower house of the Indian Parliament. He had served as the Cabinet Minister of Law, Justice and Company Affairs and as the Minister of State of Surface Transport from March 1998 to April 1999. He had also served as the Deputy Speaker of the Lok Sabha from 1985 to 1989.

Political career
Thambidurai started his political career as a youth worker and student activist of the erstwhile united DMK in 1965 at the age of 18, when he was in the first year as a student of Madras Christian College. He participated in the anti-Hindi agitation of 1965 and courted arrest. He worked his way up in the Party as a hard working organizer, starting as a worker at the booth level for Municipal and Legislative Assembly polls in 1967 and 1971 for the DMK, and also as an Agitprop coordinator in universities and colleges. He was among the founding-members and first generation of the AIADMK in 1972 when the party split with M.G. Ramachandran. He became an MLA from Erode in 1977, and was first elected as a Member of Parliament to the 8th Lok Sabha in 1984 from Karur (Lok Sabha constituency), Dharmapuri and was subsequently elected to the 9th Lok Sabha, 12th Lok Sabha, 15th Lok Sabha and 16th Lok Sabha. Also he was elected during Tamil Nadu assembly 2001,2006 Bargur (state assembly constituency) . He also served as minister of Education, Technical Education, Science and Technology, Sports and Youth Welfare, Archeology, Tamil Development and Tamil Culture, Indian Overseas, Refugees and Evacuees. He was portfolio during jayalaitha 2001 cabinet.

Thambidurai contested the 2014 Lok Sabha elections from Karur (Lok Sabha constituency) in Tamil Nadu and was subsequently elected as a member of the Indian Parliament. He had been serving as the leader of AIADMK in the Lok Sabha since 2009. He lost in the general elections in 2019 to Jothimani.

Elections contested and results

Personal life
Dr.M.Thambidurai belongs to a community which is a majority in the western Districts of Tamil Nadu which comprises the districts of Coimbatore, Tiruppur, Erode, Karur. He is member of the Trust of Adhiyamaan Educational and Research Institutions, Chennai; St.Peter's Institute of Higher Education and Research Chennai; Lakshmi Sarawathi Educational Trust, Chennai; Kovai Kalaimagal Educational Trust which is managed by his wife Dr. T. Bhanumathi.

References 

All India Anna Dravida Munnetra Kazhagam politicians
People from Tamil Nadu
Law Ministers of India
Union Ministers from Tamil Nadu
Deputy Speakers of the Lok Sabha
Living people
Lok Sabha members from Tamil Nadu
India MPs 1989–1991
India MPs 1998–1999
India MPs 2009–2014
People from Dharmapuri district
India MPs 2014–2019
People from Krishnagiri district
1947 births
University of Madras alumni
India MPs 1984–1989
People from Karur district